Uy is one of several Hokkien transcriptions of the Chinese surname Huang. Notable people with the surname include:
Alfonso A. Uy, Filipino-Chinese businessman
John James Uy (born 1987), Filipino-Chinese actor, artist, host and model
Matthew Uy (born 1990), American-born Filipino footballer 
Rolando Uy (born 1954), Filipino politician
Steve Uy (born 1979), American comic book artist and writer

Hokkien-language surnames